Bamboo Boys is a 2002 Indian Malayalam-language comedy film written and directed by Ramasimhan.  It stars Kalabhavan Mani, Cochin Haneefa, Harishree Ashokan, and Salim Kumar. The film was released on 11 October 2002.The film was unexpected box office success.

Plot

Four tribal men from a jungle - 
Olanga, Nakki, Makku and Themba come to town in search of a doctor to cure their headman's wife and to win the hands of Kuduki, the headman's daughter. Being in town for the first time, everything seems new and strange for them. They engage in mischief and cause much havoc.

Cast
Kalabhavan Mani as Olanga
Cochin Haneefa as Makku
Harishree Ashokan as Nakki
Salim Kumar as Themba 
Jagathy Sreekumar as Varkey, C.I. of Police
Janardanan as Mula Swamy
Mamukkoya as Kannan, Harithakumari's Father
Bindu Panicker as Harithakumari
Kalabhavan Shajohn as Jagan, S.I. of Police
Nadirsha as Velumban
Sagar Shiyas
Sajan Palluruthy
 Sidha Raj as Frederick Alberto, Underworld Don
 Kalabhavan Haneef

Soundtrack 
The film's soundtrack contains 8 songs, all composed by Thej Manoj. Lyrics were by Gireesh Puthenchery and Ali Akbar.

References

External links
 

2002 films
2000s Malayalam-language films